Barry John Raziano (born February 5, 1947) is a former professional baseball player who pitched in parts of the 1973 and 1974 seasons for the Kansas City Royals and California Angels, respectively, of Major League Baseball. Raziano was originally drafted by the New York Mets in the 47th round of the 1965 draft and was traded to Kansas City for Jerry Cram on February 1, 1973. Raziano was traded to the Angels for Vada Pinson and cash in February 1974 and made 13 appearances for them, also pitching for the Angels' AAA team at Salt Lake City in 1974 and 1975. After not pitching in 1976, his professional career ended with 20 relief appearances for the St. Louis Cardinals in AA New Orleans, 1977.

References

Venezuelan Professional Baseball League statistics

1947 births
Baseball players from New Orleans
California Angels players
Cardenales de Lara players
American expatriate baseball players in Venezuela
Durham Bulls players
Greenville Mets players
Jacksonville Suns players
Kansas City Royals players
Living people
Llaneros de Acarigua players
Major League Baseball pitchers
Memphis Blues players
New Orleans Pelicans (baseball) players
Omaha Royals players
Pompano Beach Mets players
Salt Lake City Angels players
Salt Lake City Gulls players
Tiburones de La Guaira players
Tidewater Tides players